Tur kaut kam ir jābūt is an album from the Latvian band Brainstorm. It is Brainstorm's sixteenth album in the Latvian language. "Tur kaut kam ir jābūt" is Latvian for "There has to be something". The Latvian version of the album contains thirteen songs. Two singles from the album, "Tur kaut kam ir jābūt" and "Ja tikai uz mani tu paskatītos", became very popular in Latvia. The album was produced by Latvian rapper/producer Gustavo. Tur kaut kam ir jābūt is the first Brainstorm album that features a rapper.

Track listing
 Ceļa dziesma
 Ja tikai uz mani tu paskatītos
 Bronza
 Atliek nosargāt
 Siāma
 Es jau nāku
 Ai nu lai
 Par podu
 Tur kaut kam ir jābūt
 Laikam
 Vakardienas trakums
 Bēdz
 Pamodini mani

External links
 Song list of Tur Kautkam ir Jābūt
 Official Brainstorm homepage

2008 albums
Brainstorm (Latvian band) albums